The Military Freefall Parachutist Badge is a military badge of the United States Army and United States Air Force awarded to qualified U.S. Army and U.S. Air Force personnel as high-altitude military parachute specialists.

Qualifications
To earn the Military Freefall Parachutist Badge, the military member first must receive all necessary ground training, already have earned the Military Parachutist Badge (jump-qualified), and must have completed the requisite freefall (night, combat equipment, oxygen) jumps and graduate from the Military Free-Fall Parachutist Course.

A star and laurel wreath, centered above the badge, called the Master Military Freefall Parachutist Badge, is authorized for U.S. Army Soldiers and U.S. Air Force Airman qualified as a Master Military Freefall Parachutist (Jumpmaster). Such qualification requires completing the Military Free-Fall Jumpmaster Course, wherein the student learns how to be a jumpmaster in military freefall operations.

As with the U.S. Army's Military Parachutist Badge, small bronze and gold stars are placed on the badge to represent participation in combat jumps, known as Combat Jump Devices, and can be awarded with either the basic and master versions of the badge.  To earn the device, a Military Freefall Parachutist must have conducted a High-altitude/low-opening (HALO) or high-altitude/high-opening (HAHO) jump in a war zone.  The stars are awarded as follows:

History
The Military Freefall Badge original design was submitted in March 1983 by Sergeant First Class Gregory A. Dailey of SFODA-552, Company B, 2nd Battalion, 5th Special Forces Group.  Updates on the design, adding a Master Military Freefall Parachutist Badge were submitted by General Wayne A. Downing of U.S. Special Operations Command (USSOCOM) and James Phillips of the Special Forces Association.  The badge was approved for wear by U.S. Army Soldiers assigned to U.S. Army Special Operations Command (USASOC) on 1 October 1994.  Unrestricted wear was approved on 7 July 1997 by General Dennis Reimer.

Symbolism of the badge's design:
The dagger is a Fairbairn–Sykes fighting knife, used by the Office of Strategic Services during World War II, and represents infiltration techniques.
The arched tab represents tabs worn by special operations forces.
The parachute is a seven-celled MT1-X, the first ram-air parachute to be adopted by the U.S. Military as the standard freefall canopy.
The wings represent flight and airborne capabilities.

Training

The U.S. Military Free-Fall School (MFFS) is operated by the USASOC's John F. Kennedy Special Warfare Center and School (SWCS), 2nd Special Warfare Training Group (Airborne), 2nd Battalion, Company B at the U.S. Army's Yuma Proving Ground (YPG) in Arizona, which is the USSOCOM proponent for military freefall.  The MFFS conducts four primary training courses, the Military Free-Fall Parachutist Course, the Military Free-Fall Jumpmaster Course, the Military Free-Fall Advanced Tactical Infiltration Course, and the Military Free-Fall Instructor Course.  The U.S. Air Force also conducts the Military Free-Fall Jumpmaster Course—certified by the MFFS—at Davis–Monthan Air Force Base for airman that are not able to attend the MFFS's jumpmaster course.  Alternatively, detachments from the MFFS conduct the Military Free-Fall Jumpmaster Course via mobile training teams (MTT) for military freefall units that have difficulty attending the course at the Yuma Proving Ground.

The Military Free-Fall Parachutist Course (MFFPC) is open to special operations forces assigned to military freefall coded positions, parachute riggers, and select DoD civilian personnel or allied personnel assigned to military freefall positions.  To attend MFFPC, students must have graduated from the U.S. Army Airborne School and must meet specific medical requirements.  Week one of the four-week course focuses on vertical wind tunnel body stabilization training at the MSG George A Bannar Wind Tunnel as well as parachute packing and an introduction to military freefall operations.  The remaining weeks focuses training on varying jump profiles using three airborne operations per training iteration, totaling 30 military freefall operations per course encompassing various conditions and equipment loads.  At the end of the course, students will have learned how to:
Pack the RA-1 Military Free-Fall Advanced Ram-Air Parachute System main parachute and don the system
Rigging/jumping procedures for weapons, combat equipment, night vision goggles and portable oxygen equipment
Aircraft procedures
Exit an aircraft from the door and ramp using dive and poised exit positions
Emergency procedures and body stabilization

Upon completion of the MFFPC, graduates are awarded the Military Freefall Parachutist Badge.

To attend the Military Free-Fall JumpMaster Course (MFFJMC), students must have graduated from the U.S. Army Airborne School, the MFFPC, the U.S. Army Jumpmaster School, be a current military freefall parachutist, served as a military freefall parachutist for a minimum of one year, and must have completed at least 50 military freefall jumps.  The three-week MFFJMC focuses on training students on jumpmaster duties and responsibilities, such as:
Nomenclature
Jumpmaster personnel inspection
Emergency procedures
Oxygen equipment
Wind drift calculations
Altimeter calculations
Emergency automatic activation device calculations
Jump commands
Aircraft procedures
Techniques of spotting
HAHO techniques
Various ram-air parachute systems packing and rigging

Upon completion of the MFFJMC, graduates are awarded the Master Military Freefall Parachutist Badge.

To attend the Military Free-Fall Advanced Tactical Infiltration Course (MFFATIC), students must have the same qualifications and completed the same prerequisites required of the MFFJMC.  The three-week MFFATIC focuses on educating and training joint special operations forces and other selected personnel in the planning and conduct of night military freefall tactical infiltrations as a group onto unknown and unmarked drop zones.  Training includes:
Following GPS guided bundles
Carrying various combat equipment
Various communications
Wearing various night vision devices
Jumping with non-standard weapons while using oxygen equipment
Utilization of various parachutist navigational devices

Upon completion of the MFFATIC, graduates are awarded a certificate of completion; there is no badge or badge device awarded for completion of the MFFATIC.

To attend the Military Free-Fall Instructor Course (MFFIC), students must be a commissioned officer, warrant officer, or non-commissioned officer and must have the same qualifications and completed the same prerequisites required of the MFFJMC and MFFATIC.  Additionally, these students must be qualified military free-fall jumpmasters, must have completed a minimum of 100 free-fall parachute jumps, and must have nine months remaining in service upon graduation.  The initial nine-week MFFIC focuses on the following over 150-200 free-fall jumps:
Learn how to conduct military free-fall jumps from the instructor's perspective
Jump as an instructor evaluating and coaching a current MFF instructor who plays the role of a new MFF student
Learn how to deal with multiple instructor-induced problems during free-fall commonly encountered with new MFF students

After nine weeks of fundamentals, student-instructors are placed as shadows at the MFFPC for three to six months.

Upon completion of the shadow program, graduates are awarded the Military Free-Fall Instructor Rating; there is no badge or badge device awarded for completion of the MFFIC.

See also
 Parachutist Badge (United States)
 Parachutist Badge
 Parachute Rigger Badge
 Pathfinder Badge
 Badges of the United States Army
 Badges of the United States Air Force
 United States Military Parachute Rigger School
 United States Army Air Assault School
 United States Army Pathfinder School
 No. 1 Parachute Training School RAF
 Parachute Training School (Australian Army)
 Parachute Training School (Pakistan Army)
 United States Army Parachute Team
 United States Army Maneuver Center of Excellence Command Exhibition Parachute Team
 United States Special Operations Command Parachute Team
 "Blood on the Risers"
 United States Army Reconnaissance and Surveillance Leaders Course

References

United States military parachuting badges